Por Um Fio is a Brazilian reality television show, which premiered September 24, 2010 with the season finale airing December 10, 2010 on the GNT television cable channel. It is the Brazilian version of Bravo's reality competition for hair stylists, Shear Genius.

The show is presented by actress Juliana Paes, who also serves as head judge. Ricardo dos Anjos and Wanda Alves are also part of the judging panel. Hair stylist Tiago Parente is the contestant's mentor.

There were twelve contestants competing for the grand prize, which was R$50,000 and a beauty editorial in the Brazilian edition of Marie Claire.

Gabriela Gusso was declared the winner, placing Andrew Jackson in second and André Ramos in third.

Production

Cast
Casting and production started in early 2010. Applications were due by June 2010 until July, 2010. Ultimately, twelve contestants were chosen by the producers to participate the show in August 2010.

Guests
In mid-August it was announced that Brazilian Marie Claire editor Monica Serino, TV presenter Sabrina Sato and actresses Carolina Ferraz and Sthefany Brito, will be guest judges during the season.

Filming
Filming started early-August, 2010 in Vila Mariana, São Paulo and run for approximately three weeks.

Contestants

The cast list was unveiled on Friday, August 20, 2010.

(ages stated at time of contest)

Elimination Chart

Key

 The stylist won the competition.
 The stylist won elimination challenge.
 The stylist was top three of the week.
 The stylist was in the bottom three and was saved first.
 The stylist was in the bottom three and was saved last.
 The stylist was eliminated.

Episodes Summaries

Print Personal Style
First Air Date: Sep 24, 2010

 WINNER: Marcelo
 CUT: Andrew

Judges: Juliana Paes, Ricardo dos Anjos, Wanda Alves, Wanderley Nunes

A New Genus
First Air Date: Oct 01, 2010

 WINNER: Mariana
 CUT: Tide
Judges: Juliana Paes, Ricardo dos Anjos, Wanda Alves, Paulo Ricardo

Blondes Become Super-Blondes
First Air Date: Oct 08, 2010

 WINNER: Neiva
 CUT: Leandro
Judges: Juliana Paes, Ricardo dos Anjos, Wanda Alves, Mariana Weickert

Ten Years Younger
First Air Date: Oct 15, 2010

 WINNER: Neiva
 CUT: Mariana
Judges: Juliana Paes, Ricardo dos Anjos, Wanda Alves, Regina Martelli

Blondes, Brunettes and Redheads
First Air Date: Oct 22, 2010

 WINNER: Angela
 CUT: Lucas, Mariana, Tide
Judges: Juliana Paes, Ricardo dos Anjos, Wanda Alves, Luciana Alvarez

Shampoo Ad
First Air Date: Oct 29, 2010

 WINNER: Gabriela
 CUT: Neiva
Judges: Juliana Paes, Ricardo dos Anjos, Wanda Alves, Daniel Klajmic

Makeover
First Air Date: Nov 05, 2010

 WINNER: Andrew
 CUT: Leonardo
Judges: Juliana Paes, Ricardo dos Anjos, Wanda Alves, Sthefany Brito

Magazine Cover
First Air Date: Nov 12, 2010

 WINNER: Andrew
 CUT: Angela
Judges: Juliana Paes, Ricardo dos Anjos, Wanda Alves, Monica Serino

Divas
First Air Date: Nov 19, 2010

 WINNER: Gabriela
 CUT: Leandro
Judges: Juliana Paes, Ricardo dos Anjos, Wanda Alves, Carolina Ferraz

Where Are My Tools?
First Air Date: Nov 26, 2010

 WINNER: Andrew
 CUT: Marcelo
Judges: Juliana Paes, Ricardo dos Anjos, Wanda Alves, Wanessa

Cartoon
First Air Date: Dec 03, 2010

 WINNER: André
 CUT: Willy
Judges: Juliana Paes, Ricardo dos Anjos, Wanda Alves, Sabrina Sato

Runway Show
First Air Date: Dec 10, 2010

 WINNER: Gabriela
 RUNNERS-UP: Andrew, André
Judges: Juliana Paes, Ricardo dos Anjos, Wanda Alves, Samuel Cirnansck

References

External links
 Official Site 

2010 Brazilian television series debuts
Brazilian reality television series
Fashion-themed reality television series
Portuguese-language television shows